1963 is an American six-issue comic book limited series written by Alan Moore in 1993, with art by his frequent collaborators Steve Bissette, John Totleben, and Rick Veitch. Dave Gibbons, Don Simpson, and Jim Valentino also contributed art. Image Comics published the series.

The six issues are an homage to the Silver Age of American comics (in particular, the early Marvel Comics), and feature spoof advertisements on the rear covers—in a manner to be repeated with a twist by Moore and Kevin O'Neill in The League of Extraordinary Gentlemen.

Marvel parody

Moore's homage to Marvel clichés included fictionalizing himself and the artists as the "Sixty-Three Sweatshop", describing his collaborators in the same hyperbolic and alliterative mode Stan Lee used for his "Marvel Bullpen"; each was given a Lee-style nickname ("Affable Al," "Sturdy Steve," "Jaunty John," etc.—Veitch has since continued to refer to himself as "Roarin' Rick"). The parody is not entirely affectionate, as the text pieces and fictional letter columns contain pointed inside jokes about the business practices of 1960s comics publishers, with "Affable Al" portrayed as a tyrant who claims credit for his employees' creations. Moore also makes reference to Lee's book Origins of Marvel Comics (and its sequels) when Affable Al recommends that readers hurry out and buy his new book How I Created Everything All By Myself and Why I Am Great.

Incomplete status

The series has never been finished. When first announced, the limited series was supposed to be followed by an 80-page annual, illustrated by Jim Lee, in which the 1963 characters were sent thirty years into "the future", where they met then-contemporary 1993 characters published by Image Comics. Moore intended comment on how the air of "realism" brought to Marvel Comics in the early 1960s had paved the way for the "mature" and "grim and gritty" American comics of the 1990s. Moore has said that his own work, Watchmen, is at least partially responsible for this trend.

Moore was less than halfway through writing the script for the annual when Jim Lee announced that he was taking a year-long sabbatical from comic book art. Moore put the script aside, and after that year had passed, many things had changed. Rob Liefeld had left Image, which meant that some of his characters could not be used. Jim Lee was swamped with work and unlikely to be able to complete the work. The tide had changed, and superhero comics had begun to become less gritty, and Moore stated that his interest in writing superheroes had waned.

In 2007, Erik Larsen was asked about the status of the project and explained, "Alan had a falling out with one of the creators on the 1963 project and he did not want to re-open those wounds. That ship may have sailed, sorry to say." Moore has publicly expressed frustration with Jim Lee for selling Wildstorm comics (which owns Moore's America's Best Comics line) to DC (whom Moore had sworn to never work for again), but it is unconfirmed whether this is what Larsen was referring to. It's more likely that Larsen was referring to Moore cutting ties with Steve Bissette due to personal issues. Bissette has outlined how things happened from his perspective, with the problem being an interview he gave to The Comics Journal:

In a later interview, Bissette explained problems might have started earlier when the 1963 creators became entangled in the internal politics at Image Comics. He explained, "My perception of events, then and now, is that we did the 1963 series under the invite and umbrella of Image founding co-partner Jim Valentino," however, "Rick Veitch and I found ourselves caught in the crossfire between the Image partners' pissing contests." These partners "quickly took the initiation of the 1963 project as an open door to working with Alan on their respective projects. Again, we didn't realize at the time this also was tied up with their competitive natures: that is, it was Jim Valentino's coup that he got Alan on board via 1963, and the other Image partners wanted a piece of that action, which would also trump Jim Valentino's initial coup."

The final issue also contained an advertisements for 1963½, which was to be a separate comics project created by Alex Cox and Paul Mavrides, published by Kitchen Sink Press. It was not directly associated with Image's 1963 and was also advertised in unrelated publications, e.g. Science Fiction Eye.

The Tomorrow Syndicate are among the characters to be featured outside of the original limited series, having made an appearance alongside Big Bang Comics' Round Table of America, in an issue of Jim Valentino's A Touch of Silver. The Fury appeared in Noble Causes: Family Secrets issue three. The Fury also appeared alongside the Syndicate in issue 14 of Valentino's Shadowhawk, in which the title character traveled back to the past in search of a cure for the AIDS virus.

Bissette has revealed that he and Veitch had been working throughout 2009 to produce a "bare-bones hardcover reprint" of 1963 at Dynamite Entertainment, but the plan fell through in January 2010. However, he did reveal that there was a "1998 legal agreement signed by Alan Moore, Rick Veitch and myself dividing up our creative properties" that left Bisette with "N-Man, the Fury, the Hypernaut and Commander Solo & Her Screamin' Skydogs" who, he thought, "fit nicely with a bevy of my own characters and concepts I've never had homes for: Curtis Slarch, Lo!, 'The Big Dig,' and much, much more you’ve never heard of or seen because I could never interest a publisher in those projects." Together they formed "my own invented comics universe — the Naut Comics universe" which became the core of his revival of the 1963 characters he owned, to be published in late 2010 in Tales of the Uncanny – N-Man & Friends: A Naut Comics History, Volume 1.

Characters and titles

Issue one introduced Mystery Incorporated, a Fantastic Four surrogate featuring Crystal Man (based on Mr. Fantastic), Neon Queen (based on Invisible Woman), Kid Dynamo (based on Human Torch) and The Planet (based on The Thing).

Issue two, No-one Escapes the Fury, featured The Fury, based on Spider-Man with elements taken from Daredevil, as well as Sky Solo, Lady of L.A.S.E.R., a female version of Nick Fury, agent of S.H.I.E.L.D., and mentions a character called "King Zero", who appears to be a Namor parody.

Issue three, an anthology comic called Tales of the Uncanny, featured USA, Ultimate Special Agent based on Captain America, and Hypernaut, who was based on Iron Man, with elements taken from Silver Surfer, Green Lantern, Arnim Zola (in appearance), and Swamp Thing. (The name Hypernaut is possibly a twist on "Supernaut", a song by Black Sabbath, whose hits include the song "Iron Man.")

Issue four, another anthology comic called Tales From Beyond, introduces readers to the Unbelievable N-Man, based on The Incredible Hulk, and Johnny Beyond, a beatnik version of Doctor Strange.

Issue five was devoted to Horus, Lord of Light, which appropriates Ancient Egyptian mythology as background for a modern era superhero in the same way that The Mighty Thor appropriated Norse Mythology.

Issue six told the story of the Tomorrow Syndicate, based on the Avengers.  This comic brought back
Horus, Lord of Light, Hypernaut, N-Man, and USA, and also introduced Infra-Man, based on Henry Pym, and Infra-Girl, based on Janet Van Dyne.

Notes

References

External links
 1963 Annotations
 Interviews with 1963 creators (in their fictional roles)
 Review, Teenage Wasteland Podcast

Comics by Alan Moore
1993 comics debuts
Unfinished comics